Toya may refer to:

Places
Tōya, Hokkaidō, a former village in Abuta District, Iburi, Hokkaidō, Japan
Tōyako, Hokkaidō, a town incorporating Tōya, Hokkaidō
Tōya Station (Tōyako), a railway station in Tōyako
Lake Tōya, a volcanic lake in Hokkaidō, Japan
Toya, Mali, a commune of the Kayes Region
Toya, Tombouctou, a town of the Tombouctou Region of Mali

People
Toya (singer), born LaToya Rodriguez, American R&B singer
Antonia "Toya" Carter, reality television star and ex-wife of rapper Lil Wayne
, Japanese footballer

Fictional characters
Toya Kinomoto, a character in Cardcaptor Sakura media
Toya (YuYu Hakusho), a character in YuYu Hakusho media
Characters in Hikaru no Go media:
Akira Toya
Toya Meijin
Tohya Miho, a character in the Megatokyo universe
Toya Aoyagi, a character in the game HATSUNE MIKU: COLORFUL STAGE!
Toya Rima, a character from the anime and manga series Vampire Knight
, a character in the manga series My Hero Academia
 Touya Mochizuki, the protagonist of the novel series, In Another World With My Smartphone
 Toya, title character in (and also title of) a Norwegian family movie from 1956

Other uses 
 Toya (company), a media and telecommunications company based in Łódź, Poland
 Toya (planthopper), a genus of planthoppers in the family Delphacidae

See also

 Tiny and Toya, an American reality TV series
Toyah (disambiguation)
LaToya (disambiguation)
Tova (disambiguation)

Japanese masculine given names